Marthe Kristoffersen (born 11 August 1989 in Vannøya, Troms) is a Norwegian cross-country skier who has competed since 2006. At the 2010 Winter Olympics, she finished 21st in the 30 km and 49th in the 10 km event.

At the 2009 World Championship in Liberec, she finished fourth in the 4 × 5 km relay, ninth in the individual sprint, and 12th in the 30 km events.

She has two World Cup victories, both in 4 × 5 km relays (2008, 2009). Kristoffersen also finished third at a 10 km event in Lahti on 8 March 2009.

She finished in 11th place overall in the 2009–10 Tour de Ski.

Cross-country skiing results
All results are sourced from the International Ski Federation (FIS).

Olympic Games

World Championships

World Cup

Season standings

Individual podiums

6 podiums – (2 , 4 )

Team podiums

 2 victories  
 4 podiums

References

External links 

Official Site

1989 births
Living people
People from Karlsøy
Cross-country skiers at the 2010 Winter Olympics
Norwegian female cross-country skiers
Olympic cross-country skiers of Norway
Sportspeople from Troms og Finnmark